KFLR-FM is the Phoenix area affiliate of Tucson-based Family Life Radio, not to be confused with Family Radio. The station airs a contemporary Christian music format with some talk and teaching programs airing as well.

Translators

External links
 KFLR official website

FLR-FM
FLR-FM
Family Life Radio stations